Coleophora dubiella is a moth of the family Coleophoridae. It is found in Algeria, Libya, Morocco, Tunisia, Spain, France, southern Russia and Turkey.

The wingspan is 19–20 mm.

The larvae feed on the leaves of Artemisia species, including Artemisia fragrans. They create a brownish-white, pistol-shaped case enclosed within two nautilus-shaped lateral silky covers.

References

dubiella
Moths described in 1888
Moths of Africa
Moths of Europe
Moths of Asia